Kirker is a surname. Notable people with the surname include:

James Kirker (1793–1852), Irish-born American privateer, soldier, mercenary, merchant, and scalp hunter
Marion Kirker (1879–1971), New Zealand photographer
Thomas Kirker (1760–1837), American politician
William Kirker (1866–1942), New Zealand cricketer
William C. Kirker, namesake of Kirkersville, Ohio

Given name
Kirker Butler, American television writer